Taimane Levu (born 25 May 1997) is an Australian rugby league footballer who primarily plays as a  for the New Zealand Warriors in the NRL Women's Premiership and Wests Panthers in the QRL Women's Premiership.

Background
Levu was born in Brisbane, Queensland and played her junior rugby league for the Inala Panthers.

Playing career
In May 2019, Levu represented South East Queensland at the Women's National Championships. On 22 June 2019, Levu represented Fetu Samoa in their 46–8 loss to New Zealand. On 11 October 2019, she started at prop for the Prime Minister's XIII in their win over Fiji.

2020
In 2020, Levu played for Ipswich Brothers in the QRL Women's Premiership and later played for the Wests Panthers in the Holcim Cup.

On 18 September, Levu joined the New Zealand Warriors NRL Women's Premiership team. In Round 1 of the 2020 NRLW season, she made her debut for the Warriors in a 28–14 loss to the Brisbane Broncos.

References

External links
New Zealand Warriors profile

1997 births
Living people
Australian sportspeople of Samoan descent
Australian female rugby league players
Samoa women's national rugby league team players
Rugby league props
New Zealand Warriors (NRLW) players